Victor Fontana (8 March 1948 – 24 December 1989) was a Romanian biathlete. He competed at the 1972 Winter Olympics and the 1976 Winter Olympics. Fontana was killed during the Romanian Revolution.

References

External links
 

1948 births
1989 deaths
Romanian male biathletes
Olympic biathletes of Romania
Biathletes at the 1972 Winter Olympics
Biathletes at the 1976 Winter Olympics
People from Bușteni
People of the Romanian Revolution
Romanian war casualties